Pyrazofurin (pyrazomycin) is a natural product found in Streptomyces candidus, which is a nucleoside analogue related to ribavirin. It has antibiotic, antiviral and anti-cancer properties but was not successful in human clinical trials due to severe side effects. Nevertheless, it continues to be the subject of ongoing research as a potential drug of last resort, or a template for improved synthetic derivatives.

See also
 Acadesine
 EICAR (antiviral)
 Sangivamycin

References 

Antiviral drugs
Tetrahydrofurans
Pyrazolecarboxamides
Polyols